Vertigo is an Israeli modern dance company. It was established by Noa Wertheim and Adi Sha'al in Jerusalem in 1992. The company's first performance was a duet featuring Wertheim and Sha'al called Vertigo. Following the group's appearances in various festivals in Israel and around the world, Vertigo has received recognition, positive reviews, and several awards from professionals and local and international audiences. The group mainly presents works by Wertheim, but it also showcases pieces by independent choreographers from within and outside the company. The company's studios are at the Gerard Behar Center in Jerusalem and at Kibbutz Netiv Halamed-Heh, where it established an ecological arts village in 2007. Vertigo's main focuses are modern dance, Contact Improvisation and the classic ballet technique.

The Vertigo Dance Company is funded by the Jerusalem Municipality and the division and the division of modern dance in the Ministry of Culture and Sport’s Culture Authority.

Vertigo founders Wertheim and Sha'al both serve as the company’s head director and arts director. Wertheim was born in 1965 in the United States. In 1990, Noa graduated from the Rubin Academy of Music and Dance in Jerusalem. While studying at the academy, she became a member of the Jerusalem modern dance group Tamar, where she met Sha'al, whose professional dance experience included the Batsheva Ensemble and the Kibbutz Dance Workshop. Wertheim and Sha'al later married and today have three children.

Performers

Inbal Alony, Rina Wertheim-Koren, Alon Karniel, Rut Valensi, Zak Vladimir, Dory Aben, Tomer Navot, Gil Karar, Eyal Vizner, Yuval Lev, Yael Tsibolski, Riki Veron, Anat Yaffe, Alex, Ron Cohen, Sandra Brown, Marija Slavec, Emmy Wielunski, Micha Amos, Itai Peri, Dorit Talpaz, Nitsan Moshe, Reut Shaibe, Sian Olles, Ran Bagno.

Works

See also
Culture of Israel
Inbal Dance Theater
Dance in Israel
Noa Dar Dance Group

Further reading
 Vertigo Dance Company's Website
 Tal Gordon, Interview - Noa Wertheim Roshemet Or (Interview in Hebrew), HaBama Website, 13 February 2014

References

Dance companies in Israel